Sumedha Chandana Wirasinghe is a Sri Lanka born academic who currently lives in Canada.

Education
Wirasinghe received his primary and secondary education at Ananda College, Colombo, and gained admission to University of Ceylon where he graduated with a degree in civil engineering. Later he received a Fulbright Scholarship to study at University of California, Berkeley. In 2001 University of Moratuwa honored Professor Chandana Weerasinghe with an honorary DSc degree.

References

Living people
Sinhalese academics
Academic staff of the University of Calgary
Year of birth missing (living people)